Mirabel is a federal electoral district in Quebec. It encompasses a portion of Quebec previously included in the electoral districts of Argenteuil—Papineau—Mirabel, Rivière-des-Mille-Îles, Terrebonne—Blainville and Rivière-du-Nord.

Mirabel was created by the 2012 federal electoral boundaries redistribution and was legally defined in the 2013 representation order. It came into effect upon the call of the 42nd Canadian federal election, scheduled for 19 October 2015.

Members of Parliament

This riding has elected the following Members of Parliament:

Election results

References

Quebec federal electoral districts
Mirabel, Quebec